Valeri Anatolyevich Smolkov (born 11 June 1971) is a former Russian professional footballer.

Club career
He made his professional debut in the Soviet First League in 1990 for FC Fakel Voronezh.

References

1971 births
People from Vladimir, Russia
Living people
Soviet footballers
Russian footballers
Association football midfielders
FC Fakel Voronezh players
FC Tekstilshchik Kamyshin players
FC Sokol Saratov players
FC Metallurg Lipetsk players
FC Tyumen players
FC Znamya Truda Orekhovo-Zuyevo players
FC Khimik-Arsenal players
Russian Premier League players
FC Torpedo Vladimir players
Sportspeople from Vladimir Oblast